This article lists advertising and marketing controversies in the Philippines. It includes media such as television commercials, print media, and branding that have been the subject of controversy as well as controversies arising from relevant methods such as sales promotions.

List

References

Controversies in the Philippines
Philippines, Category:Advertising and marketing controversies in the
Controversies
Advertising and marketing